The Burns Sisters are an American folk music group from Ithaca, New York. The group has performed and recorded with various siblings, most recently consisting of sisters Marie and Annie. They have toured with Arlo Guthrie providing backup vocals and occasionally performing as his opening act.

Early life

The Burns Sisters were raised as members of a large Irish Catholic family of 12 children in Binghamton, New York.  Their music has been influenced by their father's political activism and their mother's background as classically trained opera singer. Singing, playing, and writing music was a family tradition.

Career

The Burns Sisters' professional musical career began when several of the sisters moved to Ithaca, New York where they originally sang with the David Kent Band. One of their earliest successes was when their music appeared in the Louis Malle film Atlantic City as a result of their brother Patrick who was working on the film. As a quintet made up of sisters Marie (born c. 1957), Annie (born c. 1961), Jeannie (born c. 1958), Sheila (born c. 1963), and Terry (born c. 1962), the band released The Burns Sisters Band (1986), and Endangered Species (1989).  In 1993 the quintet released Songs of the Heart before older sisters Terry and Sheila dropped out to devote more time to their families. Agreeing to continue as a trio, Annie, Marie and Jeannie switched their focus to acoustic music.

Marie and Annie have been the primary writers and producers of the group. Most performances are with a full band which includes a dobro player, guitarist, and Marie Burns on mandolin.

In 1995 they signed with Rounder/Philo Records and released four albums for the label over the next several years, including 1996's holiday album titled Tradition: Holiday Songs Old and New which was reviewed for the Folk and Acoustic Music Exchange. Their 1997 album In This World was produced by bassist Garry Tallent who added a more rock based sound.

In 2004 The Burns Sisters met Arlo Guthrie at the Woody Guthrie Folk Festival.  This meeting resulted in the sisters touring with Arlo in 2005 on his "Arlo Guthrie and Friends Ridin' on the City of New Orleans – Benefiting Victims of Katrina" tour and again on his "The Lost World Tour" in 2008–09.

In 2012, the Burns Sisters released their album, The Hills of Ithaca. The title was inspired by a 1947 Woody Guthrie poem which the Burns Sisters put to music after being given the unpublished version by Woody's daughter, Nora Guthrie. The album also includes Bob Childers' song, "Prisoner of the Promised Land" written in Okemah, Oklahoma, while attending the Woody Guthrie Folk Festival.  The album includes two songs by Jeannie Burns: "Underbelly Blues" which she co-wrote with Andrew Hardin – her partner in the duo Hardin Burns – and “Your Kiss,” which she wrote with Hardin and her sister, Marie.

Jeannie Burns left the band in 2013 to study guitar and songwriting, with Marie and Annie continuing to perform as a duo.

Discography
{|class="wikitable"
!Year
!Title
!Record Label
|-
|2012
|The Hills of Ithaca
|Sistersmusic
|-
|2006
|Wild Bouquet
|Ithaca Records
|-
|2000
|Out of the Blue
|Rounder/Philo
|-
|1997
|In This World
|Rounder/Philo
|-
|1996
|Tradition: Holiday Songs Old & New
|Rounder/Philo
|-
|1995
|Close to Home
|Rounder/Philo
|-
|1992
|Songs of the Heart
|Independent
|-
|1989
|Endangered Species
|Columbia
|-
|1986
|I Wonder Who's Out Tonight
|Sony/BMG
|-
|1986
|The Burns Sisters Band
|Columbia
|}

References

External links
 The Burns Sisters, official web site
 The Burns Sisters sing with Arlo Guthrie on Prairie Home Companion, April 25, 2009

American folk musical groups
Musical groups from New York (state)